Kirill Leonidovich Knyazev (born June 9, 1983) is a Russian professional ice hockey player, who currently plays for Izhstal Izhevsk in the Supreme Hockey League (VHL). He is a veteran of 331 games in the Kontinental Hockey League (KHL) spanning 7 clubs.

Awards and trophies 
 September 2009: KHL forward of the month

External links 

1983 births
Living people
Ak Bars Kazan players
Avtomobilist Yekaterinburg players
HC Dynamo Moscow players
HC Neftekhimik Nizhnekamsk players
HC Spartak Moscow players
HC Yugra players
Russian ice hockey left wingers
Salavat Yulaev Ufa players
Sportspeople from Izhevsk
Torpedo Nizhny Novgorod players
Yunost Minsk players